
John Sealy Hospital is a hospital that is a part of the University of Texas Medical Branch complex in Galveston, Texas, United States.

History 
Sealy opened on January 10, 1890. It was founded by the widow and brother of one of the richest citizens of Texas, John Sealy after his death. Accompanied by the John Sealy Hospital Training School for Nurses, which was opened two months after the hospital, the foundation became the primary teaching facility of University of Texas Medical Branch opened in October 1891. In 1922, John Sealy's children, John Sealy, II and Jennie Sealy Smith established the Sealy & Smith Foundation for the hospital. This enabled construction of several new facilities, including the Rebecca Sealy Nurses' home.

A second John Sealy Hospital was built in 1954 to replace the 1890 building. Today it is known as the John Sealy Annex and houses administrative and support services.

The current John Sealy Hospital was completed in 1978 at a cost of $32.5 million and was funded in full by the Sealy & Smith Foundation. The 12-story hospital includes single-patient rooms and specialized intensive care units. Other features include the Acute Care for Elders Unit, or ACE Unit and a Level I Trauma Center, one of only three in the entire Greater Houston area.

The Sealy & Smith Foundation has contributed over $600 million to UTMB since its inception.

Hurricane Ike
Hurricane Ike forced the closing of UTMB temporarily. John Sealy Hospital and its trauma center have reopened, with renovations being undertaken in damaged areas.

See also
 List of Texas Medical Center institutions
 List of hospitals in Texas
 Rebecca Sealy Hospital

References

External links
 John Sealy Hospital History

Hospital buildings completed in 1890
Healthcare in Galveston, Texas
Buildings and structures in Galveston, Texas
Hospitals established in 1890
University of Texas Medical Branch
Institutions in the Texas Medical Center
Teaching hospitals in Texas
1890 establishments in Texas